Shambhala or Shambala is a mythical kingdom in Tibetan Buddhism. 

Shambala may also refer to:

In Buddhism
 Shambhala Buddhism, a Buddhist lineage named by Sakyong Mipham Rinpoche
 Shambhala School, a non-denominational private school in Halifax, Nova Scotia
 Shambhala Training, a secular approach to meditation developed by Chogyam Trungpa
 Shambhala Publications, a publishing company that has no affiliation with Shambhala Buddhism, which specializes in books that deal with Buddhism or related topics

Media and entertainment
 Shambala (film), a 2021 Kyrgyz submission for the Academy Award for Best International Feature Film
 Shambhala (film), a 2012 Thai film
 "Shambala" (Beastie Boys song), 1994
 "Shambala" (song), a 1973 song by Daniel Moore
 Shambhala (music festival), a Canadian music festival
 Shambala Festival, a UK festival
 Shambhala, a mythical location in the video game Uncharted 2: Among Thieves
 Shambhala Publications, an American publisher
 Shambhala, a mythical location in the video game Fire Emblem: Three Houses

Places, peoples and languages
 Shambala, Xiangcheng County, Sichuan, China
 Shambaa people, a people of Tanzania, sometimes known as "Shambala"
 Shambala language, a separate Tanzanian language

Other
 Shamballa, the dwelling place of the governing deity of Earth, Sanat Kumara, and his attendants
 Shambhala Preserve, an animal refuge founded by actress Tippi Hedren
 Shambhala: Expedición al Himalaya, a roller coaster at PortAventura Park
 Sambhal, city in Uttar Pradesh, India, origin of the Shambala concept

See also
 
 

Language and nationality disambiguation pages